is a major passenger interchange railway station located in the city of Sagamihara, Kanagawa, Japan and operated by the East Japan Railway Company (JR East) and the private railway operator Keio Corporation.

Lines
Hashimoto Station is served by the Yokohama Line and Sagami Line operated by JR East, as well as the Keio Sagamihara Line.

Station layout

The JR East station has two island platforms and one side platform. The station building is built above the platforms and tracks, and the station has a "Midori no Madoguchi" staffed ticket office. The Keio station has one elevated island platform, with the station building underneath. Interconnecting from platform 5 is impossible (as of 2022). There are platform screen doors on platforms 1, 2, and 3 for Yokohama Line. Beyond platform 4, the tracks of the Sagami Line connect with the Yokohama Line (towards Hachiōji Station). Until March 2022, the Sagami Line provided through service onto the Yokohama Line.

JR East platforms

Keio platforms

History
The JR East station opened on 23 September 1908. The Keio station opened on 31 March 1990. 

Station numbering was introduced to the Yokohama Line on 20 August 2016 with Hashimoto being assigned station number JH28.

Future plans 
The Kanagawa Prefectural Government has expressed its wishes to build an interchange station here on the Chuo Shinkansen high-speed maglev line, which is scheduled to open in 2027.

Passenger statistics
In fiscal 2019, the JR station was used by an average of 65,328 passengers daily (boarding passengers only). During the same period, the Keio portion of the station was used by 98,086 passengers daily (total).

The passenger figures for previous years are as shown below.

Surrounding area
 Midori Ward Office

See also
 List of railway stations in Japan

References

External links

 JR East station information 
 Keio station information 

Railway stations in Kanagawa Prefecture
Railway stations in Japan opened in 1908
Railway stations in Sagamihara
Keio Sagamihara Line
Sagami Line
Yokohama Line